Greg Perry (born 29 January 1949) is  a former Australian rules footballer who played with Essendon in the Victorian Football League (VFL).

Notes

External links 
		
Greg Perry's profile at Australianfootball.com

Living people
1949 births
Australian rules footballers from Victoria (Australia)
Essendon Football Club players
Stawell Football Club players